Simone Pecorini (born 12 January 1993) is an Italian footballer who plays for  club Lecco.

Club career
Born in Milan, Lombardy, Simone along with his twin brother Gabriele both started their careers at Internazionale. They were the member of Pulcini B youth team (U10) in 2002–03 season. Simone remained in the youth system until 2010, while Gabriele left for Monza in temporary deal in 2008 and did not become a professional player after became a free agent in 2009. While Simone Pecorini, graduated from U17 team in 2010 and left for the reserve of Sassuolo along with Diego Mella, as there were no room for them in Inter U19 reserve partially due to their young age. He also played once for the first team on 27 March 2011 against Siena.

Pecorini returned to Inter U19 team "Primavera" in June 2011 after Inter excised the counter-option to buy back Pecorini from Sassuolo. Under Andrea Stramaccioni, Pecorini won 2011–12 NextGen Series and also transformed into right-back from wide midfielder. However, due to insulting the referee, he was banned 9 months, until 31 December 2012. Despite shortened to 6 months ban, he missed the reserve league final and as worse as 2012 UEFA European Under-19 Football Championship elite qualification.

On 10 July 2012, Pecorini was loaned to Serie B club Empoli F.C.

Cittadella
In January 2013 Pecorini was signed by Cittadella in a temporary deal. In July 2013 he was signed in a co-ownership basis, for a peppercorn. In June 2014 Pecorini was acquired by Cittadella outright as part of the bought back of Cristiano Biraghi.

Ascoli
Pecorini was signed by Ascoli on 6 July 2015.

Entella and Avellino
On 31 January 2017 Pecorini was signed by Virtus Entella.

In summer 2017 he was signed by Avellino as a free agent.

Cuneo
On 31 January 2019, he signed with Cuneo.

Monopoli
On 7 August 2019, he signed a one-year contract with an additional one-year extension option with Monopoli.

Pro Sesto
On 19 August 2020 he joined Pro Sesto, freshly promoted into Serie C.

Lecco
On 5 July 2022, Pecorini signed with Lecco.

International career
Pecorini was a member of Italy U16 team in 2008–09 season. In August 2009 he received a call-up from U17 for a friendly tournament, and at least played the game against England national under-17 football team. Pecorini was a member of U-18 and U-19 team also.

Despite did not play any game yet in club level since the expire of the ban, he received his first U20 call-up in October 2012 against Germany to replace not available Francesco Zampano, who later re-joined the squad against Iran in the same month. Pecorini replaced Riccardo Fiamozzi at half-time against German. Pecorini received another call-up as replacement (along with Cristiano Piccini) due to the withdrew of Fiamozzi and Cristiano Biraghi. in November.

Honours
Inter Primavera
 NextGen series (1): 2011–12
 League Champion (1): 2011–12

References

External links
 Lega Serie B Profile 
 FIGC 

1993 births
Living people
Footballers from Milan
Italian footballers
Association football defenders
Serie B players
Serie C players
Inter Milan players
U.S. Sassuolo Calcio players
Empoli F.C. players
A.S. Cittadella players
Ascoli Calcio 1898 F.C. players
Virtus Entella players
U.S. Avellino 1912 players
A.C. Cuneo 1905 players
S.S. Monopoli 1966 players
S.S.D. Pro Sesto players
Calcio Lecco 1912 players
Italy youth international footballers